Helen Zerlina Margetts  (born 15 September 1961), is Professor of Internet and Society at the Oxford Internet Institute (OII), University of Oxford and from 2011 to 2018 was Director of the OII. She is currently Director of the Public Policy Programme at The Alan Turing Institute. She is a political scientist specialising in digital era governance and politics, and has published over a hundred books, journal articles and research reports in this field.

Career 
Margetts obtained her first degree, a BSc in mathematics, from the University of Bristol. In her early career she was a computer programmer and systems analyst with Rank Xerox, after which she took up postgraduate study at the London School of Economics. There she earned a MSc in Politics and Public Policy (awarded in 1990) and a PhD in Government (in 1996). From 1994 to 1999 she lectured at Birkbeck College, London.

Margetts is Professor of Internet and Society at the University of Oxford, a fellow of Mansfield College and from 2011 to 2018 was Director of the Oxford Internet Institute (OII). Prior to joining the OII in October 2004, she was a Professor in Political Science and Director of the Public Policy Programme at University College London.

Amongst her research projects at the OII, she has used a variety of methods to investigate how the Internet can affect the relationship between citizens and government, and how informational cues can affect the success of online petitions and charity fundraising. In March 2011 she was an expert witness for the UK Parliament's Public Administration Select Committee's investigation into the cost of publicly funded information technology projects.

Margetts is a Fellow of The Alan Turing Institute and is currently Director of the Public Policy Programme at the institute.

Margetts holds many advisory positions, including sitting on the UK Government's Digital Economy Council, the Home Office Scientific Advisory Council, the board of the Ada Lovelace Institute, and (from 2011-2015) the Government Digital Advisory Board.

She was appointed an Order of the British Empire (OBE) in the 2019 New Year Honours. In July 2019 she was elected as a Fellow of the British Academy.

Bibliography 
Books
Margetts has co-authored a series of books which have helped to define the field of digital-era governance:

 
 
 
 
 
 
 
 
 

Chapters in books
  Pdf.

Journal articles

 

Papers

Awards 
In July 2019 Helen was elected a Fellow of the British Academy (FBA). In March-April she held the John F Kluge Senior Chair in Technology and Society at the Library of Congress, Washington DC.  She was awarded an OBE for services to social and political science in the 2019 New Year’s Honours List. 

In 2018 she was awarded the Friedrich Schiedel Prize by the Technical University of Munich, for research and research leadership in politics and technology.  

Her co-authored book Political Turbulence won the W.J.Mckenzie Prize of the UK Political Studies Association for best politics book in 2017. 

She was elected a Fellow of the Academy of Social Sciences in 2011. 

In 2003 Margetts and Patrick Dunleavy were presented with the 'Political Scientists Making a Difference' award by the UK Policy Studies Association, in recognition for their work on a series of policy reports assessing the state of Government on the Internet for the UK National Audit Office.

References

External links 
 Profile: Helen Margetts Department of Politics and International Relations, University of Oxford
 Profile: Helen Margetts Oxford Internet Institute (OII), University of Oxford

1961 births
Fellows of Mansfield College, Oxford
Alumni of the London School of Economics
Alumni of the University of Bristol
British political philosophers
British political scientists
Living people
Women political scientists
Fellows of the British Academy
Officers of the Order of the British Empire